Hakam Singh (died 14 August 2018) was an Indian athlete who won the gold medal at the 1978 Asian Games in 20 kilometre race walk. He also won a gold in the Asian Track and Field Meeting held at Tokyo in 1979. He is a recipient of the Dhyan Chand Award.

Singh died in Sangrur, Punjab on 14 August 2018 at age 64.

References 

1950s births
2018 deaths
Indian male racewalkers
Asian Games gold medalists for India
Athletes from Punjab, India
Recipients of the Dhyan Chand Award
Asian Games medalists in athletics (track and field)
Athletes (track and field) at the 1978 Asian Games
Medalists at the 1978 Asian Games
Year of birth missing
Recipients of the Padma Shri in sports